Princess Connect! Re:Dive is an anime series adapted by CygamesPictures based on the video game of the same name developed by Cygames. It was directed by Takaomi Kanasaki with assistant directing by Kana Harufuji. Satomi Kurita, Lie Jun Yang and Yasuyuki Noda provided character designs. The series aired in Japan from April 7 to June 30, 2020, on Tokyo MX, BS11, Sun TV, and KBS Kyoto before airing on other channels. It was also simulcast in North America by Crunchyroll.

Series overview

Episode list

Season 1 (2020)

Season 2 (2022)

Notes

References

Princess Connect! Re:Dive